Davao, officially the Province of Davao, was a province in the Philippines on the island of Mindanao. The old province is coterminous with the present-day Davao Region or Region XI. It was divided into three provinces of Davao del Norte, Davao Oriental, and Davao del Sur with the passage of Philippine Republic Act No. 4867 on May 8, 1967. Two more provinces, Compostela Valley (now Davao de Oro) and Davao Occidental, were carved out of the territories of Davao del Norte and Davao del Sur respectively. The descendant provinces were reorganized into the current region in 2001.

It was one of the largest, most populous and prosperous provinces in the country during its time, being settled by immigrants from the Luzon and the Visayas.

Existence
The province was established after the dissolution of Moro Province in 1914. Before the province broke up, massive waves of immigrants from Visayas and Luzon island groups are already settling in the province. Japanese immigrants, mostly rich businessmen and pioneers, also settled in its capital Davao in large numbers, making it the Philippines' Little Japan. Having an area of more than 20,000 square kilometers, its borders were almost identical to its predecessor, the province of Nueva Guipúzcoa that existed from 1849 to 1858, which also covered parts of what are now Cotabato, South Cotabato, Sarangani, Bukidnon and the region of Caraga during the Spanish era.

After the dissolution of Nueva Guipozcoa, it was then converted into the Politico-Military Commandancia of Davao (District of Davao) for many years before it was incorporated into the Moro Province.

It was converted into a regular province and was made a district of Department of Mindanao and Sulu from 1914 until 1920.

Its capital town, Davao, became a city on March 16, 1936, as the provincial congressman Romualdo Quimpo filed Bill 609 (passed as Commonwealth Act 51), paving the creation of the city from the merger of the town of Davao (Mayo) and Guianga District. The bill called for the appointment of local officials by Commonwealth President Manuel L. Quezon. By then, it was the only city in the province throughout the latter's existence. What is now the Davao City Legislative Building served as the capitol for the governor and other provincial officials in the province.

On 1942, during the outbreak of World War II in the Philippines, forces of the Imperial Japanese Army invaded the province, becoming one of the territories in the country to be first taken by Japan. Guerrilla parties were then organized in the province to battle Japanese garrison forces there. It was in late 1944 when the Allies began liberating the island of Mindanao, and earlier the next year the dreadful Battle of Davao was fought to eliminate any Japanese resistance in the province.

The province was one of the few provinces in the country to recover quickly from the war. Its capital city resumed its role as the main economic center of Mindanao. Though some local Japanese inhabitants in the provinces were expelled from the country due to enmity after the war, most have been integrated to the local Filipino population. After the war, migration to the province has steadily increased due to the great employment and agricultural opportunities the province have, especially in its capital city.

In 1948, all municipal districts in the country have been abolished. This paved the way for the creation of several towns in the province, such as Digos, Padada, Compostela, and many others.

To reorganize governance in the country, President Ferdinand E. Marcos signed the Republic Act No. 4867 on May 8, 1967, dividing the province into three. The then-Davao Province is currently a region consisting of five provinces: Davao del Sur, Davao del Norte, Davao Occidental, Davao Oriental and Davao de Oro.

The province of Davao del Norte bore this name from 1972 until 1998, when Compostela Valley (now Davao de Oro) seceded as a separate province.

Davao Occidental was created by virtue of Republic Act 10360 enacted on July 23, 2013; the province is the newest in the country, carved out from the southern part of Davao del Sur. The Act was passed by the House of Representatives and the Senate on November 28, 2012, and December 5, 2012, respectively, and signed by President Benigno Aquino III on January 14, 2013. A plebiscite was held on October 28, 2013, along with the Barangay elections, and the majority of votes cast were "Yes", ratifying the province.

Governors of Undivided Davao

See also
Davao Region
Mindanao
Provinces of the Philippines

References

Former provinces of the Philippines
States and territories established in 1914
1914 establishments in the Philippines
1967 disestablishments in the Philippines
History of Davao del Norte
History of Davao del Sur
History of Davao Oriental
History of Davao de Oro
History of Davao Occidental